María Figueroa (born April 27, 2000) is a Spanish child singer. She became famous at age of five in 2005 when she appeared the children's program Menuda Noche (broadcast on Canal Sur, presented by Juan y Medio). María is famous for her song "Me llamo María (Yo tengo mi pompón)" ("My Name is Maria (I Have My Pom-pom)"), which was released as her first single, and is sometimes referred to simply as la niña del pompón ("the pom-pom girl").

Discography

Albums

Music videos

References 

2000 births
Living people
Spanish child singers
People from the Province of Málaga
Singers from Andalusia
Figueroa, Maria
21st-century Spanish singers
21st-century Spanish women singers